After the creation of the Warhammer Fantasy universe by Games Workshop, novels were published by GW Books and Boxtree Limited, but subsequently novels have been published by the Black Library, including translations to French and German. More than 150 novels were set in the shared universe of Warhammer Fantasy between 1989 and 2015.

According to Marc Gascoigne the idea of Chaos in Warhammer was inspired by The Eternal Champion and its sequels, written by Michael Moorcock, who made use of ideas from Three Hearts and Three Lions by Poul Anderson. The Warhammer elves were inspired by The Broken Sword by Poul Anderson as well the Middle-earth canon of J. R. R. Tolkien.

Gotrek and Felix

Gotrek & Felix: The First Omnibus 
These novels were collected in omnibus in 2003 and 2006 and with additional short stories in 2013 and 2018.
Trollslayer by William King (1999, incorporates Geheimnisnacht originally published 1989 in Warhammer: Ignorant Armies, Wolf Riders originally published 1989 in Warhammer: Wolf Riders, The Dark Beneath the World originally published 1990 in Warhammer: Red Thirst, The Mutant Master originally published 1997 in Inferno! issue 1, and Ulric's Children originally published 1999 in Inferno! issue 11, reissue 2019)
Skavenslayer by William King (1999, incorporates Skaven's Claw originally published 1992 in White Dwarf issues 152 and 153)
Daemonslayer by William King (1999)
A Place of Quiet Assembly by John Brunner (short story, originally published 2010 in Hammer and Bolter issue 1)
Blood Sport by Josh Reynolds (short story, originally published 2012 in the 15th Birthday Collection)
Kineater by Jordan Ellinger (short story, originally published 2012 in Gotrek and Felix: The Anthology)
Mind-Stealer by C. L. Werner (short story, originally published 2012 in Gotrek and Felix: The Anthology)
Death and Glory! by William King (short story, originally published 1993 in Warhammer Armies: The Empire)

Gotrek & Felix: The Second Omnibus 
These novels were collected in omnibus in 2004 and 2006 and with additional short stories in 2013 and 2019.
Dragonslayer by William King (2000)
Beastslayer by William King (2001)
Vampireslayer by William King (2001)
The Tilean's Talisman by David Guymer (short story, originally published 2011 in Hammer and Bolter issue 14)
A Cask of Wynters by Josh Reynolds (short story, originally published 2012 in Gotrek and Felix: The Anthology)
Prophecy by Ben McCallum (short story, originally published 2012 in Gotrek and Felix: The Anthology)
Lord of Undeath by William King (short story, originally published 1994 in Warhammer Armies: Undead)
The Two Crowns of Ras Karim by Nathan Long (short story, 2006)

Gotrek & Felix: The Third Omnibus 
These novels and short story were collected in omnibus in 2009 and with additional short stories in 2013 and 2019.
Giantslayer by William King (2003)
Redhand's Daughter by William King (short story, originally published 2003 in Inferno! issue 36)
Orcslayer by Nathan Long (2006)
Manslayer by Nathan Long (2007)
The Oberwald Ripper by L. J. Goulding (short story, originally published 2012 in Hammer and Bolter issue 18)
Red Snow by Nathan Long (short story, originally published 2010 in Death & Dishonour)
Last Orders by Andy Smillie (short story, originally published 2012 in Gotrek and Felix: The Anthology)

Gotrek & Felix: The Fourth Omnibus 
These novels, novella and short stories were collected in omnibus in 2013 and 2019.
Elfslayer by Nathan Long (2008)
Slayer of the Storm God by Nathan Long (novella, originally published 2009 as an audio drama)
Shamanslayer by Nathan Long (2009)
Zombieslayer by Nathan Long (2010)
The Funeral of Gotrek Gurnisson by Richard Salter (short story, originally published 2012 in Gotrek and Felix: The Anthology)
Slayer's Honour by Nathan Long (short story, originally published 2012 in Gotrek and Felix: The Anthology)

Gotrek & Felix: The Fifth Omnibus 
These novels and short stories were collected in omnibus in 2020.
Road of Skulls by Josh Reynolds (2013)
The Serpent Queen by Josh Reynolds (2014)
Lost Tales (2013)
Charnel Congress by Josh Reynolds
The Reckoning by Jordan Ellinger
Into the Valley of Death by Frank Cavallo
Curse of the Everliving by David Guymer
Marriage of Moment by Josh Reynolds (short story, 2014)
Berthold's Beard by Josh Reynolds (short story, originally published 2012 in Black Library Weekender: Volume One)
The Contest by Jordan Ellinger (short story, previously part of the Advent Calendar 2012 eBundle)

Gotrek & Felix: The Sixth Omnibus 
These novels and short story were collected in omnibus in 2021.
City of the Damned by David Guymer (2013)
Kinslayer by David Guymer (2014, paperback 2016)
Rememberers by David Guymer (2015)
Slayer by David Guymer (2015, paperback 2016)

Other stories 
The Lost Kinsmen by William King (originally published 1990 in Realm of Chaos: The Lost and the Damned, republished 2013 in Gotrek and Felix: Myths and Legends)

Warhammer Chronicles

The Legend of Sigmar 
These novels and short stories were authored by Graham McNeill and collected in omnibus in 2012 and with an additional short story in 2017. Heldenhammer won the David Gemmell Legend Award in 2010.
Heldenhammer (2008)
Empire (2009)
God King (2011)
Let The Great Axe Fall (short story, 2012)
Gods of Flesh and Blood (short story, originally published 2012 in Black Library Weekender: Volume One)
Sword Guardian (short story, originally published 2012 in the 15th Birthday Collection)

The Rise of Nagash 
These novels were authored by Mike Lee and collected in omnibus in 2012 and with an additional short story in 2017.
Nagash the Sorcerer (2008)
Nagash the Unbroken (2010)
Nagash Immortal (2011)
Picking the Bones (short story, 2012)

Vampire Wars: The von Carstein Trilogy 
These novels and short stories were authored by Steven Savile and collected in omnibus in 2008 and 2018.
Inheritance (2006)
Dominion (2006)
Retribution (2007)
Death's Cold Kiss (short story, originally published 2006 in The Cold Hand of Betrayal)
The Court of the Crimson Queen (short story, 2008)

The Sundering 
These novels and stories were authored by Gav Thorpe and collected in omnibus in 2012 and 2018.
Malekith (2009)
The Bloody-Handed (novella, 2010)
Shadow King (2009)
Caledor (2011)
The Dark Path (short story, originally published in the Black Library Live! 2009 Chapbook)

Champions of Chaos 
These novels and short stories were collected in omnibus in 2018.
Sigvald by Darius Hinks (2011)
Valkia the Bloody by S. P. Cawkwell (2009)
Bloodraven by S. P. Cawkwell (short story, originally published 2012 in Age of Legend)
Blood Blessing by S. P. Cawkwell (short story, originally published 2012 in the 15th Birthday Collection)
Reaper by S. P. Cawkwell (short story, originally published in the Black Library Live! 2012 Chapbook)
Harbinger by S. P. Cawkwell (short story, 2014)
Van Horstmann by Ben Counter (2013)

The War of Vengeance 
These novels were collected in omnibus in 2015 and 2018.
The Great Betrayal by Nick Kyme (2012)
Master of Dragons by Chris Wraight (2013)
The Curse of the Phoenix Crown by C. L. Werner (2015)

Mathias Thulmann: Witch Hunter 
These novels and short stories were authored by C. L. Werner and collected in omnibus in 2008 and 2018.
A Choice of Hatreds (short story, originally published 2001 in Inferno! issue 22)
Meat Wagon (short story, originally published 2003 in Inferno! issue 35)
Witch Work (short story, 2008)
Witch Hunter (2004, reissue 2022)
Witch Finder (2005)
Witch Killer (2006)

Ulrika the Vampire 
These novels were authored by Nathan Long and collected in omnibus in 2018.
Bloodborn (2010)
Bloodforged (2011)
Bloodsworn (2012)

Masters of Stone and Steel 
These novels and short story were collected in omnibus in 2011 under the name Dwarfs and with an additional novel and short story in 2018.
The Doom of Dragonback by Gav Thorpe (2014)
Ancestral Honour by Gav Thorpe (short story, originally published 2001 in Inferno! issue 23)
Grudge Bearer by Gav Thorpe (2005)
Oathbreaker by Nick Kyme (2008)
Honourkeeper by Nick Kyme (2009)
City of Dead Jewels by Nick Kyme (short story, originally published 2012 in Age of Legend)

The Tyrion & Teclis Omnibus 
These novels were authored by William King and collected in omnibus in 2018.
Blood of Aenarion (2011)
Sword of Caledor (2012)
Bane of Malekith (2013)

Warriors of the Chaos Wastes 
These novels were authored by C. L. Werner and collected in omnibus in 2019.
Palace of the Plague Lord (2007)
Blood for the Blood God (2008)
Wulfrik (2010)

Knights of the Empire 
These novels and short stories were collected in omnibus in 2019.
Hammers of Ulric by Dan Abnett, Nik Vincent, and James Wallis (2000, incorporates The Dead Among Us originally published 1998 in Inferno! issue 5, A Company of Wolves originally published 1998 in Inferno! issue 7, Wolf in Sheep's Clothing originally published 1998 in Inferno! issue 9, and The Bretonnian Connection originally published 1999 in Inferno! issue 13, reissue 2020)
Reiksguard by Richard Williams (2009)
Knight of the Blazing Sun by Josh Reynolds (2012)
Dead Calm by Josh Reynolds (short story, originally published 2011 in Hammer and Bolter issue 13)
Stromfel's Teeth by Josh Reynolds (short story, originally published 2012 in Hammer and Bolter issue 17)
Lords of the Marsh by Josh Reynolds (short story, originally published 2012 in Hammer and Bolter issue 20)
Dead Man's Party by Josh Reynolds (short story, originally published 2012 in Hammer and Bolter issue 21)
Bernheimer's Gun by Josh Reynolds (short story, 2014)

Warlords of Karak Eight Peaks 
These novels and stories were collected in omnibus in 2019.
Skarsnik by Guy Haley (2013)
Headtaker by David Guymer (2013)
Thorgrim by David Guymer (novella, 2014)
The Karag Durak Grudge by David Guymer (short story, 2013)
The King of Black Crag by Guy Haley (short story, 2013)

Skaven Wars: The Black Plague Trilogy 
These novels were authored by C. L. Werner and collected in omnibus in 2015 and with additional short stories in 2019.
Dead Winter  (2012)
Blighted Empire  (2013)
Wolf of Sigmar  (2014)
Plague Priest (short story, originally published 2012 in the Black Library Games Day Anthology 2011/12)
Plague Doktor (short story, originally published 2012 in Age of Legend)
A Question of Faith (short story, 2014)
The Last Man (short story, originally published 2013 in The Black Library Anthology 2013/14)

The Orion Trilogy 
These novels were authored by Darius Hinks and collected in omnibus in 2019.
The Vaults of Winter (2012)
Tears of Isha (2013)
The Council of Beasts (2014)

Brunner the Bounty Hunter 
These novels and short story were authored by C. L. Werner and collected in omnibus in 2010 and 2019.
What Price Vengeance? (short story, rewritten version, originally published 2002 in Inferno! issue 33)
Blood Money (2002, incorporates a rewritten version of Wolfshead originally published 2010 in Death & Dishonour)
Blood and Steel (2003, incorporates Sickhouse originally published 2005 in Inferno! issue 46)
Blood of the Dragon (2004)

Thanquol and Boneripper 
These novels and short stories were authored by C. L. Werner and collected in omnibus in 2019.
Grey Seer (2009)
Temple of the Serpent (2010)
Thanquol's Doom (2011)
Mind-Stealer (short story, originally published 2012 in Gotrek and Felix: The Anthology)
Thanquol Triumphant (short story, previously part of the Advent Calendar 2012 eBundle)

Heroes of the Empire 
These novels and short stories were authored by Chris Wraight and collected in omnibus in 2012 under the name Swords of the Emperor, in 2016 under the name Total War: The Emperor's Armies, and with an additional novel and short story in 2020.
Sword of Justice (2010)
Feast of Horrors (short story, originally published in the Black Library Live! 2010 Chapbook)
Sword of Vengeance (2011)
Duty and Honour (short story, 2012)
Luthor Huss (2012)
The March of Doom by Chris Wraight (short story, originally published 2012 in the Black Library Games Day Anthology 2011/12)

Elves: The Omnibus 
These novels and short stories were authored by Graham McNeill and collected in omnibus in 2012 and 2020.
Kinstrife (short story, originally published 2006 in The Cold Hand of Betrayal)
Defenders of Ulthuan (2007)
Sons of Ellyrion (2011)
Deathmasque (short story, originally published in the Black Library Live! 2011 Chapbook)
Guardians of the Forest (2005)
Freedom's Home or Glory's Grave (short story, originally published 2007 in Tales of the Old World)

Undeath Ascendant: A Vampire Counts Omnibus 
These novels and short stories were collected in omnibus in 2011 under the name Vampires and with an additional novel in 2021.
The Red Duke by C. L. Werner (2011)
Ancient Blood by Robert Earl (2008)
Curse of the Necrarch by Steven Savile (2008)
Portrait of My Undying Lady by Gordon Rennie (short story, originally published 2000 in Inferno! issue 21)
The Vampire Hunters by Robert Earl (short story, originally published 2004 in Inferno! issue 41)
Three Knights by Graham McNeill (short story, originally published 2002 in Inferno! issue 29)

The Chronicles of Malus Darkblade: Volume One 
These novels and short story were authored by Dan Abnett and Mike Lee and collected in omnibus in 2008 and 2021.
The Blood Price (short story, 2008)
The Daemon's Curse (2005, reissue 2021)
Bloodstorm (2005)
Reaper of Souls (2006)

Knights of Bretonnia 
These novels, novellas and short story were authored by Anthony Reynolds and collected in omnibus in 2011 and 2021.
Knight Errant (2008)
Knight of the Realm (2009)
Rest Eternal (short story, originally published 2010 in Death & Dishonour)
Questing Knight (novella, originally published 2010 in Hammer and Bolter issue 1)
Grail Knight (novella, 2011)

The Chronicles of Malus Darkblade: Volume Two 
These novels and short story were collected in omnibus in 2009 and 2022.
Warpsword by Dan Abnett and Mike Lee (2007)
Lord of Ruin by Dan Abnett and Mike Lee (2007)
Deathblade by C. L. Werner (2015)
Bloodwalker by C. L. Werner (short story, originally published 2012 in Black Library Weekender: Volume Two)

Empire at War 
These novels and short stories were collected in omnibus in 2014 under the name The Empire and, using a different selection, in 2022. Warrior Priest won the David Gemmell Morningstar Award in 2011.
Riders of the Dead by Dan Abnett (2003)
Grimblades by Nick Kyme (2010)
Warrior Priest by Darius Hinks (2010)
Swords of the Empire edited by Marc Gascoigne and Christian Dunn (2004)
The Vampire Hunters by Robert Earl (originally published 2004 in Inferno! issue 41)
Meat Wagon by C. L. Werner (originally published 2003 in Inferno! issue 35)
The Case of the Scarlet Cell by Gordon Rennie
Rest for the Wicked by James Wallis (originally published 2002 in Inferno! issue 32)
The Nagenhof Bell by Jonathan Green (originally published 2001 in Inferno! issue 27)
Swords of the Empire by Dan Abnett
Shyi-Zar by Dan Abnett (short story, originally published 2004 in the Chaos Rising booklet)
As Dead As Flesh by Nick Kyme (short story, originally published 2004 in Inferno! issue 45)
Dead Man's Hand by Nick Kyme (short story, originally published 2007 in Tales of the Old World)
Sanctity by Nick Kyme (short story, originally published 2007 in Invasion!)
The Miracle at Berlau by Darius Hinks (short story, originally published 2010 in Death & Dishonour)

Blackhearts 
These novels and short stories were authored by Nathan Long and collected in omnibus in 2007 and 2023.
Hetzau's Follies (short story, originally published 2005 in Inferno! issue 46)
Valnir's Bane (2004)
Rotten Fruit (short story, originally published 2007 in Tales of the Old World)
The Broken Lance (2005)
Tainted Blood (2006)

Warhammer Fantasy

The Adventures of Florin & Lorenzo 
These novels and short story were authored by Robert Earl and collected in omnibus in 2009.
The Burning Shore (2004)
Haute Cuisine (short story, originally published 2007 in Tales of the Old World)
Wild Kingdoms (2004)
Savage City (2005)

The Ambassador Chronicles 
These novels were authored by Graham McNeill and collected in omnibus in 2005.
The Ambassador (2003, incorporates The Ambassador originally published 2001 in Inferno! issue 25)
Ursun's Teeth (2004)

Angelika Fleischer 
These novels and short stories were authored by Robin D. Laws and collected in omnibus in 2010 under the name The Fleischer Omnibus.
Meat & Bone (short story, originally published 2002 in Inferno! issue 28)
Honour of the Grave (2003)
Sacred Flesh (2004)
Liar's Peak (2005)
Head Hunting (short story, originally published 2002 in Inferno! issue 31)

Archaon 
These novels and short story were authored by Rob Sanders and collected in omnibus in 2016 under the name Total War: Lord of Chaos. They serve as a prequel to The End Times.
Archaon: Everchosen (2014)
Archaon: Lord of Chaos (2015)
Archaon: The Fall and the Rise (short story, 2014)

Blood of Nagash 
These novels were authored by Josh Reynolds.
Neferata (2012)
Master of Death (2013)

Blood on the Reik 
These novels were authored by Alex Stewart under the pen name Sandy Mitchell.
Death's Messenger (2005)
Death's City (2005)
Death's Legacy (2006)

Daemon Gates 
These novels were authored by Aaron Rosenberg.
Day of the Daemon (2006)
Night of the Daemon (2007)
Hour of the Daemon (2007)

The End Times

Prequel to The End Times 
Sigmar's Blood by Phil Kelly (2013)

Lords of the Dead 
These novels and short stories were collected in omnibus in 2016.
The Bone Cage by Phil Kelly (short story, 2014)
With Ice and Sword by Graham McNeill (short story, 2015)
The Return of Nagash by Josh Reynolds (2014)
Marienburg's Stand by David Guymer (short story, 2015)
The Fall of Altdorf by Chris Wraight (2014)

Doom of the Elves 
These novels and short stories were collected in omnibus in 2016.
The Siege of Naggarond by S. P. Cawkwell (short story, 2015)
Bride of Khaine by Graeme Lyon (short story, 2015)
Deathblade by C. L. Werner (2015)
The Curse of Khaine by Gav Thorpe (2015)

Death of the Old World 
These novels were collected in omnibus in 2016.
The Rise of the Horned Rat by Guy Haley (2015, paperback 2015)
The Lord of the End Times by Josh Reynolds (2015)

Gilead 
These novels and short story were authored by Dan Abnett and Nik Vincent.
Gilead's Blood (2001, incorporates Gilead's Wake originally published 1997 in Inferno! issue 3, Gilead's Fate originally published 1998 in Inferno! issue 8, and Gilead's Test originally published 1999 in Inferno! issue 13, reissue 2013)
Gilead's Curse (2013, originally serialized 2011 and 2012 in Hammer and Bolter issues 13 to 26)

The Konrad Saga 
These novels were authored by David S. Garnett under the pen name David Ferring and collected in omnibus in 2005.
Konrad (1989, reissue 2001)
Shadowbreed (1990, reissue 2002)
Warblade (1993, reissue 2002)

Marienburg 
These novels were authored by David Bishop.
A Murder in Marienburg (2007)
A Massacre in Marienburg (2008)

Marks of Chaos 
These novels were authored by James Wallis and collected in omnibus in 2010.
Mark of Damnation (2003)
Mark of Heresy (2003)
No Rest for the Wicked (short story, originally published 2002 in Inferno! issue 32)
A Night Too Long (short story, originally published 2003 in Inferno! issue 37)

Slaves to Darkness 
These novels were authored by Gav Thorpe and collected in omnibus in 2012.
The Claws of Chaos (2002)
The Blades of Chaos (2003)
The Heart of Chaos (2004)

Stefan Kumansky 
These novels were authored by Neil McIntosh.
Star of Erengrad (2002)
Taint of Evil (2003, rewritten version of The Gifts of Tal Dur originally published 2000 in Inferno! issue 20)
Keepers of the Flame (2005, rewritten version of Debt of Blood originally published 2001 in Inferno! issue 23)

Storm of Magic 
Razumov's Tomb by Darius Hinks (2011)
Dragonmage by Chris Wraight (2011)
The Hour of Shadows by C. L. Werner (2011)

Tales of Orfeo 
These novels were authored by Brian Stableford under the pen name Brian Craig.
Zaragoz (1989, reissue 2002)
Plague Daemon (1990, reissue 2002)
Storm Warriors (1991, reissue 2002)

The Vampire Genevieve 
These novels were authored by Kim Newman under the pen name Jack Yeovil and collected in omnibus in 2005 and 2021.
Drachenfels (1989, reissue 2019)
Genevieve Undead (1993, reissue 2019)
Beasts in Velvet (1993, reissue 2019)
Silver Nails (2002, reissue 2019)
Red Thirst (originally published 1990 in Warhammer: Red Thirst)
No Gold in the Grey Mountains (originally published 1989 in Warhammer: Wolf Riders)
The Ignorant Armies (originally published 1989 in Warhammer: Ignorant Armies)
The Warhawk
The Ibby the Fish Factor

Warhammer Online: Age of Reckoning 
Empire in Chaos by Anthony Reynolds (2008)
Dark Storm Gathering by Chris Wraight (2009)
Forged by Chaos by C. L. Werner (2009)

Zavant 
This novel and short story were authored by Gordon Rennie and collected in omnibus in 2011.
Zavant (2002, incorporates The Affair of the Araby Exhibit originally published 1999 in Inferno! issue 10 and Red Moon Over Altdorf originally published 1999 in Inferno! issue 14)
The Case of the Scarlet Cell (short story, originally published 2004 in Swords of the Empire)

Stand-alone novels 
The Wine of Dreams by Brian Stableford under the pen name Brian Craig (2000)
The Dead and the Damned by Jonathan Green (2002, incorporates The Hounds of Winter originally published 1997 in White Dwarf issue 210, Dark Heart originally published 1998 in Inferno! issue 5, and The Plague Pit originally published 2000 in Inferno! issue 20)
Magestorm by Jonathan Green (2004)
Forged in Battle by Justin Hunter (2005)
Necromancer by Jonathan Green (2005)
Vermintide by Bruno Lee (2006)
Fell Cargo by Dan Abnett (2006, originally serialized 2003 in Inferno! issues 35 and 37 to 39, reissue 2010)
The Corrupted by Robert Earl (2006)
Mark of Chaos by Anthony Reynolds (2006)
The Enemy Within by Richard L. Byers (2007)
Masters of Magic by Chris Wraight (2008)
Runefang by C. L. Werner (2008)
The Battle for Skull Pass by Nathan Long (2009)
Iron Company by Chris Wraight (2009, reissue 2020)
Call to Arms by Mitchel Scanlon (2010)
The Island of Blood by Darius Hinks (2010)
Broken Honour by Robert Earl (2011)
Dreadfleet by Phil Kelly (2011)

Anthologies 
Warhammer: Ignorant Armies edited by David Pringle (1989, reissue 1993)
Geheimnisnacht by William King
The Reavers and the Dead by Charles Stross under the pen name Charles Davidson
The Other by Nicola Griffith
Apprentice Luck by Paul McAuley under the pen name Sean Flynn
A Gardener in Parravon by Brian Stableford under the pen name Brian Craig
The Star Boat by Steve Baxter
The Ignorant Armies by Kim Newman under the pen name Jack Yeovil
The Laughter of Dark Gods by William King
Warhammer: Wolf Riders edited by David Pringle (1989, reissue 1995)
Wolf Riders by William King
The Tilean Rat by Alex Stewart under the pen name Sandy Mitchell
The Phantom of Yremy by Brian Stableford under the pen name Brian Craig
Cry of the Beast by Ralph T. Castle
No Gold in the Grey Mountains by Kim Newman under the pen name Jack Yeovil
The Hammer of the Stars by Pete Garratt
Pulg's Grand Carnival by Simon Ounsley
The Way of the Witchfinder by Brian Stableford under the pen name Brian Craig
Warhammer: Red Thirst edited by David Pringle (1990, reissue 1995)
Red Thirst by Kim Newman under the pen name Jack Yeovil
The Dark Beneath the World by William King
The Spells Below by Neil Jones
The Light of Transfiguration by Brian Stableford under the pen name Brian Craig
The Song by Steve Baxter
The Voyage South by Nicola Griffith
Realm of Chaos edited by Marc Gascoigne and Andy Jones (2000)
Birth of a Legend by Gav Thorpe (originally published 1997 in Inferno! issue 2)
The Hounds of Winter by Jonathan Green (originally published 1997 in White Dwarf issue 210)
Hatred by Ben Chessel (originally published 1997 in Inferno! issue 2)
Grunsonn's Marauders by Andy Jones (originally published 1997 in Inferno! issue 1)
The Doorway Between by Rjurik Davidson (originally published 1999 in Inferno! issue 12)
Mormacar's Lament by Chris Pramas (originally published 1998 in Inferno! issue 6)
The Blessed Ones by Rani Kellock (originally published 1999 in Inferno! issue 11)
Dark Heart by Jonathan Green (originally published 1998 in Inferno! issue 5)
The Chaos Beneath by Mark Brendan (originally published 1998 in Inferno! issue 7)
Paradise Lost by Andy Jones (originally published 1998 in Inferno! issue 4)
Wolf in the Fold by Ben Chessel (originally published 1998 in Inferno! issue 9)
The Faithful Servant by Gav Thorpe (originally published 1997 in Inferno! issue 3)
Lords of Valour edited by Marc Gascoigne and Christian Dunn (2001)
Faith by Robert Earl (originally published 2000 in Inferno! issue 17)
A Choice of Hatreds by C. L. Werner (originally published 2001 in Inferno! issue 22)
Tybalt's Quest by Gav Thorpe (originally published 2000 in Inferno! issue 18)
Who Mourns a Necromancer? by Brian Stableford under the pen name Brian Craig (originally published 2000 in Inferno! issue 17)
Son and Heir by Ian Winterton (originally published 2000 in Inferno! issue 21)
The Judas Goat by Robert Earl (originally published 1999 in Inferno! issue 15)
The Sound Which Wakes You by Ben Chessel (originally published 2000 in Inferno! issue 21)
Portrait of My Undying Lady by Gordon Rennie (originally published 2000 in Inferno! issue 21)
The Plague Pit by Jonathan Green (originally published 2000 in Inferno! issue 20)
Ancestral Honour by Gav Thorpe (originally published 2001 in Inferno! issue 23)
A Gentleman's War by Neil Rutledge (originally published 1999 in Inferno! issue 15)
The Ultimate Ritual by Neil Jones and William King (originally published 1999 in Inferno! issue 16)
The Laughter of Dark Gods edited by David Pringle (2002)
The Laughter of Dark Gods by William King (originally published 1989 in Warhammer: Ignorant Armies)
The Reavers and the Dead by Charles Stross under the pen name Charles Davidson (originally published 1989 in Warhammer: Ignorant Armies)
The Phantom of Yremy by Brian Stableford under the pen name Brian Craig (originally published 1989 in Warhammer: Wolf Riders)
The Other by Nicola Griffith (originally published 1989 in Warhammer: Ignorant Armies)
The Song by Steve Baxter (originally published 1990 in Warhammer: Red Thirst)
Apprentice Luck by Paul McAuley under the pen name Sean Flynn (originally published 1989 in Warhammer: Ignorant Armies)
The Light of Transfiguration by Brian Stableford under the pen name Brian Craig (originally published 1990 in Warhammer: Red Thirst)
The Spells Below by Neil Jones (originally published 1990 in Warhammer: Red Thirst)
Cry of the Beast by Ralph T. Castle (originally published 1989 in Warhammer: Wolf Riders)
A Gardener in Parravon by Brian Stableford under the pen name Brian Craig (originally published 1989 in Warhammer: Ignorant Armies)
The Tilean Rat by Alex Stewart under the pen name Sandy Mitchell (originally published 1989 in Warhammer: Wolf Riders)
Way of the Dead edited by Marc Gascoigne and Christian Dunn (2003)
Glow by Simon Spurrier (originally published 2003 in Inferno! issue 34)
Head Hunting by Robin D. Laws (originally published 2002 in Inferno! issue 31)
The Small Ones by C. L. Werner (originally published 2001 in Inferno! issue 26)
Three Knights by Graham McNeill (originally published 2002 in Inferno! issue 29)
The Road to Damnation by Brian Stableford under the pen name Brian Craig
Mark of the Beast by Jonathan Green (originally published 2003 in Inferno! issue 34)
Jahama's Lesson by Matthew Farrer (originally published 2002 in Inferno! issue 24)
A Good Thief by Simon Jowett (originally published 2002 in Inferno! issue 32)
What Price Vengeance? by C. L. Werner (originally published 2002 in Inferno! issue 33)
The Cold Hand of Betrayal edited by Marc Gascoigne and Christian Dunn (2006)
Kinstrife by Graham McNeill
Small Mercy by Richard Ford
Perfect Assassin by Nick Kyme (originally published 2004 in Inferno! issue 40)
Sickhouse by C. L. Werner (originally published 2005 in Inferno! issue 46)
In the Service of Sigmar by Adam Troke
Blood and Sand by Matt Ralphs
Son of the Empire by Robert Allan
The Daemon's Gift by Robert Baumgartner
Death's Cold Kiss by Steven Savile
Tales of the Old World edited by Marc Gascoigne and Christian Dunn (2007)
Freedom's Home or Glory's Grave by Graham McNeill
Ancestral Honour by Gav Thorpe (originally published 2001 in Inferno! issue 23)
A Gentleman's War by Neil Rutledge (originally published 1999 in Inferno! issue 15)
The Doorway Between by Rjurik Davidson (originally published 1999 in Inferno! issue 12)
Birth of a Legend by Gav Thorpe (originally published 1997 in Inferno! issue 2)
Haute Cuisine by Robert Earl
Paradise Lost by Andy Jones (originally published 1998 in Inferno! issue 4)
Night Too Long by James Wallis (originally published 2003 in Inferno! issue 37)
Grunsonn's Marauders  by Andy Jones (originally published 1997 in Inferno! issue 1)
The Man Who Stabbed Luther van Groot by Alex Stewart under the pen name Sandy Mitchell
The Faithful Servant by Gav Thorpe (originally published 1997 in Inferno! issue 3)
The Sound Which Wakes You by Ben Chessel (originally published 2000 in Inferno! issue 21)
The Sleep of the Dead by Darius Hinks (originally published 2003 in Inferno! issue 38)
The Path of Warriors by Neil McIntosh (originally published 2002 in Inferno! issue 33)
Rat Trap by Robert Earl
Rotten Fruit by Nathan Long
Faith by Robert Earl (originally published 2000 in Inferno! issue 17)
Portrait of My Undying Lady by Gordon Rennie (originally published 2000 in Inferno! issue 21)
The Seventh Boon by Mitchel Scanlon (originally published 2004 in Inferno! issue 43)
Rattenkrieg by Robert Earl (originally published 2004 in Inferno! issue 45)
Mormacar's Lament by Chris Pramas (originally published 1998 in Inferno! issue 6)
The Chaos Beneath by Mark Brendan (originally published 1998 in Inferno! issue 7)
Wolf in the Fold by Ben Chessel (originally published 1998 in Inferno! issue 9)
The Blessed Ones by Rani Kellock (originally published 1999 in Inferno! issue 11)
Dead Man's Hand by Nick Kyme
Shyi-Zar by Dan Abnett (originally published 2004 in the Chaos Rising booklet)
Tybalt's Quest by Gav Thorpe (originally published 2000 in Inferno! issue 18)
A Choice of Hatreds by C. L. Werner (originally published 2001 in Inferno! issue 22)
Who Mourns a Necromancer? by Brian Stableford under the pen name Brian Craig (originally published 2000 in Inferno! issue 17)
The Hanging Tree by Jonathan Green (originally published 2004 in Inferno! issue 42)
The Doom that Came to Wulfhafen by C. L. Werner (originally published 2002 in Inferno! issue 29)
Hatred by Ben Chessell (originally published 1997 in Inferno! issue 2)
Son and Heir by Ian Winterton (originally published 2000 in Inferno! issue 21)
Ill Met in Mordheim by Robert Waters
Totentanz by Brian Stableford under the pen name Brian Craig (originally published 2001 in Inferno! issue 27)
The Ultimate Ritual by Neil Jones and William King (originally published 1999 in Inferno! issue 16)
Invasion! edited by Marc Gascoigne and Christian Dunn (2007)
None So Blind by Nathan Long
Premonition by Chris Wraight
Purification by Robert E. Vardeman
Sanctity by Nick Kyme
Spoils of War by Rick Wolf
The Gift by Jesse Cavazos V
River of Blood by Steven Eden
Lies of the Flesh by Steven Savile
Perilous Visions by Mike Lee
Death & Dishonour edited by Alex Davis, Nick Kyme and Lindsey Priestley (2010)
Red Snow by Nathan Long
The Assassin's Dilemma by David Earle
Rest Eternal by Anthony Reynolds
The Miracle at Berlau by Darius Hinks
Noblesse Oblige by Robert Earl
The Last Ride of Heiner Rothstein by Ross O'Brien
Broken Blood by Paul Kearney
The Judgement of Crows by Chris Wraight
Wolfshead by C. L. Werner
War Unending edited by Christian Dunn (2010)
Swords of the Empire by Dan Abnett (originally published 2004 in Swords of the Empire)
The Small Ones by C. L. Werner (originally published 2001 in Inferno! issue 26)
Rattenkrieg by Robert Earl (originally published 2004 in Inferno! issue 45)
Redhand's Daughter by William King (originally published 2003 in Inferno! issue 36)
Portrait of My Undying Lady by Gordon Rennie (originally published 2000 in Inferno! issue 21)
Virtue's Reward by Darius Hinks
The Blood Price by Dan Abnett and Mike Lee (originally published 2008 in The Chronicles of Malus Darkblade: Volume One)
Glow by Simon Spurrier (originally published 2003 in Inferno! issue 34)
Three Knights by Graham McNeill (originally published 2002 in Inferno! issue 29)
The Seventh Boon by Mitchel Scanlon (originally published 2004 in Inferno! issue 43)
Broken Blood by Paul Kearney (originally published 2010 in Death & Dishonour)
Age of Legend edited by Christian Dunn (2012)
A Small Victory by Paul S. Kemp
Bloodraven by S. P. Cawkwell
City of Dead Jewels by Nick Kyme
The Last Charge by Andy Hoare (originally published 2011 in Hammer and Bolter issue 10)
The Ninth Book by Gav Thorpe
The Gods Demand by Josh Reynolds (originally published 2011 in Hammer and Bolter issue 11)
Plague Doktor by C. L. Werner
The City is Theirs by Philip Athans
The Second Sun by Ben Counter
Aenarion by Gav Thorpe (originally published 2010 as an audio drama)
15th Birthday Collection (2012)
Blood Blessing by S. P. Cawkwell
Blood Sport by Josh Reynolds
Cankerworm by Darius Hinks
Voices by David Guymer
Gilead's Craft by Nik Vincent
Sword Guardian by Graham McNeill
Black Library Games Day Anthology 2011/12
The March of Doom by Chris Wraight
Plague Priest by C. L. Werner
Black Library Games Day Anthology 2012/13
Master of Mourkain by Josh Reynolds
Black Library Weekender: Volume One (2012)
Gods of Flesh and Blood by Graham McNeill
Berthold's Beard by Josh Reynolds
Black Library Weekender: Volume Two (2012)
The Great Maw by L. J. Goulding
Bloodwalker by C. L. Werner
Advent Calendar 2012 eBundle (2013)
The Riddle of Scorpions by Josh Reynolds (2012)
Never Forgive by Gav Thorpe (2012)
Thanquol Triumphant by C. L. Werner (2012)
Voyage of the Sunspear by Ben Counter (2012)
The Contest by Jordan Ellinger (2012)
The Last Little Bit by Robert Earl (2012)
Like Father, Like Son by Mark Latham (2012)

Other stories

White Dwarf magazine 
Issue 117 (1989)
No Gold in the Grey Mountains by Kim Newman under the pen name Jack Yeovil (preview of Warhammer: Wolf Riders)
Issue 136 (1991)
The Magician's Son by Barrington J. Bayley
Issue 142 (1991)
The Black Sail by Neil McIntosh
Issue 152 (1992)
Skaven's Claw Part 1 by William King
Issue 153 (1992)
Skaven's Claw Part 2 by William King

Apocrypha Now
Fire & Earth by James Wallis (1995)

Inferno! magazine 
Issue Zero (White Dwarf issue 210, 1997)
The Hounds of Winter by Jonathan Green
Issue 1 (1997)
The Mutant Master by William King
Grunsonn's Marauders by Andy Jones
Issue 2 (1997)
Hatred by Ben Chessel
Birth of a Legend by Gav Thorpe
Issue 3 (1997)
Gilead's Wake by Dan Abnett
The Faithful Servant by Gav Thorpe
Issue 4 (1998)
Paradise Lost by Andy Jones
Issue 5 (1998)
The Dead Among Us by James Wallis
Dark Heart by Jonathan Green
Issue 6 (1998)
Mormacar's Lament by Chris Pramas
Issue 7 (1998)
A Company of Wolves by Dan Abnett
The Chaos Beneath by Mark Brendan
Issue 8 (1998)
Gilead's Fate by Dan Abnett
Issue 9 (1998)
Wolf in the Fold by Ben Chessel
Wolf in Sheep's Clothing by Dan Abnett
Issue 10 (1999)
The Affair of the Araby Exhibit by Gordon Rennie
Issue 11 (1999)
Ulric's Children by William King
The Blessed Ones by Rani Kellock
Issue 12 (1999)
The Doorway Between by Rjurik Davidson
Issue 13 (1999)
Gilead's Test by Dan Abnett
The Bretonnian Connection by James Wallis
Issue 14 (1999)
Red Moon Over Altdorf by Gordon Rennie
Issue 15 (1999)
A Gentleman's War by Neil Rutledge
The Judas Goat by Robert Earl
Issue 16 (1999)
The Ultimate Ritual by Neil Jones and William King
Issue 17 (2000)
Faith by Robert Earl
Who Mourns a Necromancer? by Brian Stableford under the pen name Brian Craig
Issue 18 (2000)
Tybalt's Quest by Gav Thorpe
Issue 19 (2000)
Issue 20 (2000)
The Gifts of Tal Dur by Neil McIntosh
The Plague Pit by Jonathan Green
Issue 21 (2000)
The Sound Which Wakes You by Ben Chessel
Son and Heir by Ian Winterton
Portrait of My Undying Lady by Gordon Rennie
Issue 22 (2001)
A Choice of Hatreds by C. L. Werner
Issue 23 (2001)
Debt of Blood by Neil McIntosh
Ancestral Honour by Gav Thorpe
Issue 24 (2001)
Jahama's Lesson by Matthew Farrer
Issue 25 (2001)
The Ambassador by Graham McNeill
Tybalt's Battle by Gav Thorpe
A Fool's Bargain by Brian Maycock
The Deep by Rjurik Davidson
Issue 26 (2001)
The Winter Wind by Brian Stableford under the pen name Brian Craig
The Small Ones by C. L. Werner
Issue 27 (2001)
The Nagenhof Bell by Jonathan Green
Totentanz by Brian Stableford under the pen name Brian Craig
Issue 28 (2002)
Meat & Bone by Robin D. Laws
Issue 29 (2002)
The Doom that Came to Wulfhafen by C. L. Werner
Three Knights by Graham McNeill
Issue 30 (2002)
Issue 31 (2002)
Head Hunting by Robin D. Laws
A Matter of Evidence by Brian Stableford under the pen name Brian Craig
Issue 32 (2002)
A Good Thief by Simon Jowett
Rest for the Wicked by James Wallis
Issue 33 (2002)
What Price Vengeance? by C. L. Werner
The Path of Warriors by Neil McIntosh
Issue 34 (2003)
Glow by Si Spurrier
Mark of the Beast by Jonathan Green
Issue 35 (2003)
A Ship Called Rumour by Dan Abnett
Meat Wagon by C. L. Werner
Issue 36 (2003)
Redhand's Daughter by William King
Issue 37 (2003)
The Doom of the Sacramento by Dan Abnett
Night Too Long by James Wallis
Issue 38 (2003)
Dry Land and Clean Drinking by Dan Abnett
The Sleep of the Dead by Darius Hinks
Issue 39 (2003)
Threading the Teeth by Dan Abnett
Wind of Change by C. L. Werner
Issue 40 (2004)
Cold Light of Day by Rob Sanders
Perfect Assassin by Nick Kyme
Issue 41 (2004)
The Vampire Hunters by Robert Earl
Vespertine by David Griffiths
Issue 42 (2004)
A Storm Rising by Nick Kyme
The Hanging Tree by Jonathan Green
Issue 43 (2004)
The Seventh Boon by Mitchell Scanlon
The Cuckoo of Hammerbilt by James Peaty
To Guard the Dead by Brian Maycock
Issue 44 (2004)
Issue 45 (2004)
Rattenkrieg by Robert Earl
As Dead as Flesh by Nick Kyme
Issue 46 (2005)
Hetzau's Follies by Nathan Long
Sickhouse by C. L. Werner

Hammer and Bolter 
Issue 1 (2010)
A Place of Quiet Assembly by John Brunner
Questing Knight by Anthony Reynolds
Issue 2 (2010)
The Dark Path by Gav Thorpe (originally published in the Black Library Live! 2009 Chapbook)
The Rat Catcher's Tail by Richard Ford
Issue 3 (2010)
Virtue's Reward by Darius Hinks (originally published 2010 in War Unending)
Charandis by Ben McCallum
Issue 4 (2011)
The Barbed-Wire Cat by Robert Earl
Issue 5 (2011)
Feast of Horrors by Chris Wraight (originally published in the Black Library Live! 2010 Chapbook)
Issue 6 (2011)
The First Duty by Josh Reynolds
Grail Knight by Anthony Reynolds 
Issue 7 (2011)
Manbane by Andy Hoare
Issue 8 (2011)
Marshlight by C. L. Werner
Issue 9 (2011)
Sir Dagobert's Last Battle by Jonathan Green
Issue 10 (2011)
Mountain Eater by Andy Smillie
The Last Charge by Andy Hoare
Issue 11 (2011)
The Gods Demand by Josh Reynolds
Issue 12 (2011)
Aenarion by Gav Thorpe (originally published 2010 as an audio drama)
Issue 13 (2011)
Dead Calm by Josh Reynolds 
Issue 14 (2011)
The Tilean's Talisman by David Guymer
Issue 15 (2011)
Issue 16 (2012)
Issue 17 (2012)
Stromfel's Teeth by Josh Reynolds
Issue 18 (2012)
The Oberwald Ripper by L. J. Goulding
Slayer of the Storm God by Nathan Long (originally published 2009 as an audio drama)
Issue 19 (2012)
Issue 20 (2012)
The Talon of Khorne by Frank Cavallo
Lords of the Marsh by Josh Reynolds
Issue 21 (2012)
Dead Man's Party by Josh Reynolds
Issue 22 (2012)
Butcher's Beast by Jordan Ellinger
Leechlord by Frank Cavallo
Issue 23 (2012)
The Hunter by Graeme Lyon
Let the Great Axe Fall Part 1 by Graham McNeill
Issue 24 (2012)
Let the Great Axe Fall Part 2 by Graham McNeill
Issue 25 (2012)
The Court Beneath by Phil Kelly
The Problem of Three-Toll Bridge by Josh Reynolds
Issue 26 (2012)
The Fangs of the Asp by Josh Reynolds

E-shorts 
Unseen by David Guymer (2013)
Golfgag's Revenge by Justin D. Hill (2013)
Tomb of the Golden Idol: Part 1 by Andy Hoare (2013)
Tomb of the Golden Idol: Part 2 by Andy Hoare (2013)
Ghoul King 1: Conqueror of Worms by Josh Reynolds (2014)
Ghoul King 2: Empire of Maggots by Josh Reynolds (2014)
Sticks and Stones by Jonathan Green (2014)
The Battle of Whitestone by Justin D. Hill (2014)

Inferno! anthologies 
Inferno! Volume 1 (2018)
Waking the Dragon by Josh Reynolds
How Vido Learned the Trick by Josh Reynolds

Total War: Warhammer stories 
All Tunnels Lead to Skavenblight by Andy Hall and Chris Gambold (2017)
Prince of Altdorf by Andy Hall (2017)
The Forked Tongue by Andy Hall and Chris Gambold (2017)
The Siren of the Storm by Andy Hall (2018)
The Mage and the Sorceress by Andy Hall and Chris Gambold
The Epic Saga of Wulfrick the Sarl
The Peasant Knight
The Nocturne for Mousillon

Path to Victory gamebooks 
Beneath the City of the White Wolf by M. F. Bradshaw (2012)
Shadows over Sylvania by Jonathan Green (2013)

Warhammer Fantasy background books 
The Loathsome Ratmen by Mitchel Scanlon (2004)
Blood on the Reik by Matt Ralphs (2005)
The Life of Sigmar by Matt Ralphs (2005)
Liber Chaotica by Marijan von Staufer and Richard Williams (2006)
Liber Necris by Alessio Cavatore, Jervis Johnson, William King, Tuomas Pirinen, and Marijan von Staufer (2006)
The Empire at War by Matt Ralphs (2006)
The Witch Hunter's Handbook by Darius Hinks (2006)
Warhammer Quiz Book by Adam Troke (2007)
Grudgelore by Nick Kyme and Gav Thorpe (2008)

Warhammer Fantasy graphic novels 

The Complete Tales from the Ten-Tailed Cat edited by Marc Gascoigne and Christian Dunn (2005)
The Call of Chaos edited by Marc Gascoigne, Andy Jones, and Christian Dunn (2005)
Darkblade: Reign of Blood by Dan Abnett and Kev Hopgood (2005), reissued with an additional story as Darkblade, The graphic novel (2011)
Darkblade Book I: Born of Blood (2000)
Darkblade Book II: World of Blood (2001)
Darkblade Book III: Throne of Blood (2003)
Darkblade Book IV: Banner of Blood
Hellbrandt Grimm by Mitchel Scanlon and the Sharp Brothers (2005)
Blood of the Empire (2008)
Forge of War by Dan Abnett and Ian Edginton (2007, reissue 2016)
Condemned by Fire by Dan Abnett and Ian Edginton (2008, reissue 2016)
Crown of Destruction by Kieron Gillen (2008, reissue 2016)
Warhammer Online: Prelude To War by Graham McNeill (2008, published as part of the collector's edition of Warhammer Online: Age of Reckoning)

Blood Bowl

The Blood Bowl Omnibus 
These novels were authored by Matt Forbeck and collected in omnibus in 2007 and 2020.
Blood Bowl (2005)
Dead Ball (2005)
Death Match (2006)
Rumble in the Jungle (2007)
A Guide to Blood Bowl

Death on the Pitch 
These short stories were collected in omnibus in 2018 and with two additional short stories in 2020.
Manglers Never Lose by Josh Reynolds
Fixed by Robbie MacNiven
Da Bank Job by Andy Hall
The Hack Attack by Matt Forbeck
Mazlocke's Cantrip of Superior Substitution by Graeme Lyon
Pride and Penitence by Alex Worley
The Skeleton Key by David Annandale
Scrape to Victory by Gav Thorpe
Doc Morgrim's Vow by Josh Reynolds
A Last Sniff of Glory by David Guymer
Foul Play by Andy Hall
Hoppo's Pies by Guy Haley
The Freelancer by Robert Rath
Dismember the Titans by Graeme Lyon (originally published 2019 in Inferno! Volume 3)

Blood Bowl Comics 
Blood Bowl: Killer Contract by Matt Forbeck
Blood Bowl: More Guts, More Glory by Nick Kyme

Warhammer Age of Sigmar

The Realmgate Wars: Volume 1 
These novels and short story were collected in omnibus in 2018.
The Gates of Azyr by Chris Wraight (2015)
War Storm (2015)
Borne by the Storm by Nick Kyme
Storm of Blades by Guy Haley
The Gates of Dawn by Josh Reynolds
Ghal Maraz (2015)
War in the Hidden Vale by Josh Reynolds
The Eldritch Fortress by Guy Haley
Hammers of Sigmar (2015)
Stormcast by Darius Hinks
Scion of the Storm by C. L. Werner
Wardens of the Everqueen by C. L. Werner (2016)
Black Rift by Josh Reynolds (2016)
Pantheon by Guy Haley (short story, 2016)

The Realmgate Wars: Volume 2 
These novels and short stories were collected in omnibus in 2018.
Warbeast by Gav Thorpe (2016)
Call of Archaon (2015)
Beneath the Black Thumb by David Guymer (short story)
Eye of the Storm by Rob Sanders (short story)
The Solace of Rage by Guy Haley (short story)
Knight of Corruption by David Annandale (short story)
The Trial of the Chosen by Guy Haley (short story)
In the Lands of the Blind by Rob Sanders (short story)
Blood and Plague by David Annandale (short story)
See No Evil by Rob Sanders (short story)
Fury of Gork by Josh Reynolds (2016)
Bladestorm by Matt Westbrook (2016)
Mortarch of Night (originally published 2015 as an audio drama)
The Prisoner of the Black Sun by Josh Reynold (short story)
Sands of Blood by Josh Reynold (short story)
The Lords of Helstone by Josh Reynold (short story)
Bridge of Seven Sorrows by Josh Reynold (short story)
The Beasts of Cartha by David Guymer (short story)
Fist of Mork, Fist of Gork by David Guymer (short story)
Great Red by David Guymer (short story)
Only the Faithful by David Guymer (short story)
Lord of Undeath by C. L. Werner (2016)

Legends of the Age of Sigmar 
These novels were collected in omnibus in 2017.
Fyreslayers (2016)
Four Thousand Days by David Guymer
The Keys to Ruin by David Annandale
Shattered Crucible by David Annandale
The Volturung Road by Guy Haley
Skaven Pestilens by Josh Reynolds (2016)
Sylvaneth (2016)
The Resolute by Josh Reynolds
Heartwood by Robbie MacNiven
The Splintered by Rob Sanders
Wrathspring by Gav Thorpe
The Outcast by Josh Reynolds

Age of Sigmar novels 
Nagash: The Undying King by Josh Reynolds (2018)
Soul Wars by Josh Reynolds (2018)
Callis & Toll: The Silver Shard by Nick Horth (2018)
The Tainted Heart by C. L. Werner (2018)
Scourge of Fate by Robbie MacNiven (2018)
Hamilcar: Champion of the Gods by David Guymer (2019)
Gloomspite by Andy Clark (2019)
The Court of the Blind King by David Guymer (2019)
Lady of Sorrows by C. L. Werner (2020)
Realm-Lords by Dale Lucas (2020)
Sons of Behemat by Graeme Lyon (audio drama, 2020)
Warcry Catacombs: Blood of the Everchosen by Richard Strachan (2020)
Covens of Blood by Anna Stephens, Liane Merciel, and Jamie Crisalli (2020)
Heirs of Grimnir (audio drama, 2020)
Bonereapers by David Guymer (2020)
Stormvault by Andy Clark (2021)
The End of Enlightenment by Richard Strachan (2021)
Lady of Sorrows by C. L. Werner (2021)
Dominion by Darius Hinks (2021)

Age of Sigmar anthologies 
Call of Chaos (2015)
Hammerhal & Other Stories (2017)
Sacrosanct & Other stories (2018)
Gods and Mortals (2019)
Myths & Revenants (2019)
Warcry (2019)
Oaths and Conquests (2020)
Direchasm  (2020)

Blacktalon 
First Mark by Andy Clark (2018)

Eight Lamentations 
Spear of Shadows by Josh Reynolds (2017)
War-Claw by Josh Reynolds (audio drama, 2018)

Gotrek Gurnisson 
Realmslayer by David Guymer (audio drama, 2018, hardcover 2019)
The Bone Desert by Robbie MacNiven (2018)
One, Untended by David Guymer (2018)
Realmslayer: Blood of the Old World by David Guymer (audio drama, 2019)
The Neverspike by Darius Hinks (2019)
Ghoulslayer by Darius Hinks (2019, paperback 2020)
Death on the Road to Svardheim by Darius Hinks (2020)
Gitslayer by Darius Hinks (2021, paperback 2022)
Soulslayer by Darius Hinks (2022)

Hallowed Knights 
Plague Garden by Josh Reynolds (2017)
Black Pyramid by Josh Reynolds (2018)
The Denied by Jos Reynolds (audio drama, 2018)

Kharadron Overlords 
Overlords of the Iron Dragon by C. L. Werner (2017)
Profit's Ruin by C. L. Werner (2020)
City of Secrets by Nick Horth (2017)

Neferata 
Mortarch of Blood by David Annandale (2018)
The Dominion of Bones by David Annandale (2019)

The Khul 
The Red Feast by Gav Thorpe (2019)

Warhammer Underworlds 
Shadespire: The Mirrored City by Josh Reynolds (2018)
Beastgrave by C. L. Werner (2019)
Shadespire: The Darkness in the Glass by David Annandale, David Guymer, Guy Haley (audio drama, 2018)
The Palace of Memories and other stories by David Annandale, David Guymer, Guy Haley (audio drama, 2019)

Notes

References

External links 
Black Library at Games Workshop
Black Library website

Book series introduced in 1989
Lists of fantasy books
Warhammer 
Warhammer Fantasy novels